In mathematics, the Weil–Petersson metric is a Kähler metric on the Teichmüller space Tg,n of genus g Riemann surfaces with n marked points. It was introduced by  using the Petersson inner product on forms on a Riemann surface (introduced by Hans Petersson).

Definition

If a point of Teichmüller space is represented by a Riemann surface R, then the cotangent space at that point can be identified with the space of quadratic differentials at R. Since the Riemann surface has a natural hyperbolic metric, at least if it has negative Euler characteristic, one can define a Hermitian inner product on the space of quadratic differentials by integrating over the Riemann surface. This induces a Hermitian inner product on the tangent space to each point of Teichmüller space, and hence a Riemannian metric.

Properties

 stated, and  proved,  that the Weil–Petersson metric is a Kähler metric.  proved that it has negative holomorphic sectional, scalar, and Ricci curvatures.  The Weil–Petersson metric is usually not complete.

Generalizations

The Weil–Petersson metric can be defined in a similar way for some moduli spaces of higher-dimensional varieties.

References

Riemann surfaces
Moduli theory